Elie Lainé (1829-1911) was a French landscape architect, chiefly remembered for the restoration of the gardens at Vaux le Vicomte, the layout of the grounds at Waddesdon Manor and the creation of numerous parks and gardens for Léopold II, the king of Belgium.

Biographical information 

Lainé was born in 1829 in the northern French town of Brain-sur-l'Authion, Maine-et-Loire, where most of his family were small-scale farmers. He worked as a gardener in the nearby town of Angers in his twenties. Once he was established as a landscape architect, he set up his home and studio in the Petit-Montrouge area of Paris, and lived there between 1879 and 1898. Lainé never married, and retired to a grand house he designed in his home town, Brain-sur-l'Authion, where he died in 1911, aged 82.

Projects in England and France 

His first project of note as a landscape architect was for Ferdinand de Rothschild, whose home at Waddesdon Manor in Buckinghamshire, England, was designed by the Parisian architect Hippolyte Destailleur. Lainé worked at Waddesdon for at least eleven years, laying out roads, terraces and plantations of mature trees, and helping turn the site from a wild, muddy hill into one of the finest gardens in England.

At Vaux le Vicomte, Seine-et-Marne, Lainé was employed by the new owner of the chateau, Alfred Sommier, from about 1876 to restore the classical gardens originally designed by Andre Le Nôtre in the mid-seventeenth century. While Hippolyte Destailleur led the restoration of the chateau, Lainé worked on the grounds, which had lain abandoned for many years. He laid miles of pipes so that 20 of the grand water features could work again, and raised the level of the entire garden by some 20 cm so he could add fresh topsoil. By 1891 the French press was hailing the gardens (with their pools, canals, cascade, fountains, terraces, statues and magnificent hornbeam hedges) as being fully restored to their original state.

Lainé worked for other private clients in France: from 1881 he laid out the grounds of the Chateau d'Armainvilliers, Seine-et-Marne, for Edmond de Rothschild, creating a park that the family remembered as "particularly awe-inspiring and a great luxury" and he designed the garden and grounds for Baron Eugene Roger at La Triboulette, Vouzeron, Cher (1887).

Belgian projects 

From 1889 Lainé worked for Léopold II, having been recommended to the Belgian king by Ferdinand de Rothschild. His designs included the neo-classical gardens at the Palais des Colonies (now the Royal Museum for Central Africa) in Tervuren, created for the 1897 Brussels World Fair; the naturalistic parc de Woluwé in Brussels; the grounds of the chateau royal d'Ardenne; and the royal estate of Ciergnon and Villers-sur-Lesse in the south of the country. He produced a master plan for Ostend, the king's summer home on the Belgian coast, and also designed the grounds of various villas owned by the king in the south of France.
His last known project was in 1905, at the parc de Jenneret in the Ardennes, for Baron Paul-Louis de Favereau, the king's foreign secretary.

Legacy 

An obituary described Lainé as "the celebrated Parisian landscape architect." Many of his projects still exist a hundred years after his death, but very few of his plans and other papers have survived. In the early part of the 21st century his name became confused with the unrelated Vendéen architect Emile Lainé (1863-1930), who has therefore wrongly received much of the credit for Elie Lainé's work in Brussels.

Gallery of projects

Further reading 

 Herman Balthazar and Jean Stengers, La Dynastie et la Culture en Belgique, Anvers 1990, pp. 180–228.
 Nathalie de Harlez de Deulin, Parcs et Jardins Historiques de Wallonie, l’Institut royal du Patrimoine wallon, 2008, p. 109ff.
 Piet Lombaerde, in collaboration with Ronny Gobyn, Léopold II roi-bâtisseur, Gand, 1995. 
 Jill Sinclair, "Looking for Monsieur Lainé," Historic Gardens Review, Issue 29, pp. 11–15.
 Edme Sommier, Vaux-le-Vicomte, Notice historique, 1933.

References

External links 
 Waddesdon Manor entry on English Heritage Register of Historic Parks and Gardens

French landscape and garden designers
French landscape architects
19th-century French people
French urban planners
1829 births
1911 deaths
Waddesdon Manor